Fujio Kakuta (27 January 1911 – 1938) was a Japanese gymnast. He competed at the 1932 Summer Olympics and the 1936 Summer Olympics.

References

External links
 

1911 births
1938 deaths
Japanese male artistic gymnasts
Olympic gymnasts of Japan
Gymnasts at the 1932 Summer Olympics
Gymnasts at the 1936 Summer Olympics
Place of birth missing